Hopkins Nunataks is a group of three nunataks rising to  at the head of Cambridge Glacier, between the Coombs Hills and the Convoy Range in Victoria Land. Named by the Advisory Committee on Antarctic Names in 2007 after Steve Hopkins who worked for several seasons at McMurdo Station, first as a cargo handler loading and unloading C-141 and C-130 aircraft, later attaining the lead supervisory cargo position. He was injured during the 2001–2002 season in a helicopter crash at Lake Fryxell while working as Lead Helo-tech for helicopter operations.

References

Mountains of Victoria Land